The 1965 Bandy World Championship was the fourth Bandy World Championship and was contested between four men's bandy playing nations. The championship was played in five cities of Soviet Union (Arkhangelsk, Ivanovo, Kursk, Moscow and Sverdlovsk) on February 21–27, 1965. The Soviet Union became champions.

Participants

Premier tour
 21 February
 Soviet Union – Finland 5–0
 Sweden – Norway 2–2
 24 February
 Sweden-Finland 1–2
 Soviet Union – Norway 4–0
 26 February
 Finland – Norway 0–1
 27 February
 Soviet Union – Sweden 3–3

References

1965
International bandy competitions hosted by the Soviet Union
World Championships
Bandy World Championships
Bandy World Championships